Rafaël Harvey-Pinard (born January 6, 1999) is a Canadian professional ice hockey forward currently playing for the  Montreal Canadiens of the National Hockey League (NHL). Harvey-Pinard was selected in the seventh round, 201st overall, by the Canadiens in the 2019 NHL Entry Draft. He made his NHL debut with Montreal in 2021.

Playing career
Harvey-Pinard played major junior hockey in the Quebec Major Junior Hockey League (QMJHL) with the Rouyn-Noranda Huskies and the Chicoutimi Saguenéens.

Following the completion of junior career, Harvey-Pinard was signed to a one-year contract with the Laval Rocket of the AHL, the primiary affiliate of the Canadiens, on May 29, 2020. In the pandemic delayed 2020–21 season, Harvey-Pinard embarked on his professional career and registered 9 goals and 20 points in 36 regular season games. Towards the final stages of his rookie season, Harvey-Pinard was signed by the Montreal Canadiens to a two-year, entry-level contract, on May 13, 2021.

Career statistics

References

External links
 

1999 births
Living people
Canadian ice hockey forwards
Chicoutimi Saguenéens (QMJHL) players
Ice hockey people from Quebec
Laval Rocket players
Montreal Canadiens draft picks
Montreal Canadiens players
Rouyn-Noranda Huskies players
Sportspeople from Saguenay, Quebec